Beida (also transliterated Al Beyda') is a common village name in the Darfur region of Sudan. The map linked below shows several. This town is also spelled Bardai, a spelling originally appearing on a 1929 British map of the area, later reprinted by the US Army Map Service in 1951 as Series Y501 Sheet 53-O at 1:250,000 scale.

External links
 Map of Darfur, showing Beida

Populated places in West Darfur